The secretary of state for the Home Department is a secretary of state in the Government of the United Kingdom, with responsibility for the Home Office As a Great Office of State, the home secretary is one of the most senior and influential ministers in the government. The incumbent is a statutory member of the British Cabinet and National Security Council.

The position, which may be known as interior minister in other nations, was created in 1782, though its responsibilities have changed many times. Past office holders have included the prime ministers Lord North, Robert Peel, the Duke of Wellington, Lord Palmerston, Winston Churchill, James Callaghan and Theresa May. In 2007, Jacqui Smith became the first female home secretary. The incumbent home secretary is Suella Braverman.

The office holder works alongside the other Home Office ministers and the permanent under-secretary of state of the Home Office. The corresponding shadow minister is the shadow home secretary, and the performance of the home secretary is also scrutinized by the Home Affairs Select Committee and the Justice and Home Affairs Committee.

Responsibilities
Corresponding to what is generally known as an interior minister in many other countries, the home secretary's remit includes:
 Law enforcement in England and Wales
 Matters of national security
 Issues concerning immigration
 Oversight of the Security Service (MI5).

Formerly, the home secretary was the minister responsible for prisons and probation in England and Wales; however in 2007 those responsibilities were transferred to the Ministry of Justice under the lord chancellor.

In addition, from 1894 the home secretary was required to attend royal births to ensure that the baby and potential heir to the throne was a descendent of the monarch, and not an imposter. This practice was discontinued by King George VI shortly before the birth of Prince Charles in 1948.

History
The title Secretary of State in the government of England dates back to the early 17th century. The position of Secretary of State for the Home Department was created in the British governmental reorganisation of 1782, in which the responsibilities of the Northern and Southern Departments were reformed into the Foreign Office and Home Office.

In 2007, the new Ministry of Justice took on the criminal justice functions of the Home Office and its agencies.

List of home secretaries

See also
 British government departments
 Cabinet (government)
 Great Offices of State
 Interior minister
 List of British governments
 List of current interior ministers
List of permanent under secretaries of state of the Home Office
 Ministry of Justice
 Shadow Home Secretary
 Home Office under Theresa May
Under Secretary of State for the Home Department

Notes

References

Citations

Sources

External links

 Home Office website

Home Department, Secretary of State
 
Ministerial offices in the United Kingdom
1782 establishments in Great Britain
United Kingdom